Dave Willis (born May 1, 1970) is an American voice actor, writer, animator, producer and musician. He is best known as the co-creator of the Adult Swim animated series Aqua Teen Hunger Force and Squidbillies, the former of which he voices the characters of Meatwad and Carl Brutananadilewski. He is also known for voicing Barry Dylan in the FXX series Archer and Leto Otel in Ballmastrz: 9009.

Career
Willis has worked on various Adult Swim shows that are created primarily by Williams Street, an animation-centered, Atlanta-based production division of Cartoon Network.

Willis got hired at Ghost Planet Industries after giving the producers a very formal letter of recommendation written in crayon, seemingly by a young child. They liked his sense of humor and hired Willis as a writer for Cartoon Planet in 1995 and then as a writer for Space Ghost Coast to Coast (SGC2C for short) soon after. In early 2000, he helped write and produce the two Brak Presents the Brak Show Starring Brak specials.

Willis was working on Space Ghost Coast to Coast where he first met Matt Maiellaro, with whom Willis would later create many independent short films and eventually create the popular Adult Swim cartoon Aqua Teen Hunger Force. Aqua Teen Hunger Force first premiered unannounced in the early hours of December 30, 2000 and later officially debuted on Adult Swim in the Fall of 2001. In 2005, he co-created the show Squidbillies. His works mostly fall into the genre of surreal humour.

In 2010, Willis created Cheyenne Cinnamon and the Fantabulous Unicorn of Sugar Town Candy Fudge, a new television pilot for Adult Swim. The pilot aired on March 29, 2010, and was not picked up for a full series. In 2010, Willis co-wrote "New Kidney in Town", an episode of Family Guy.

Personal life
Willis was born in Wichita Falls, Texas, and was raised mostly in Conyers, Georgia. He graduated from Wake Forest University and was station manager at Wake Radio. He resides in Atlanta with his wife and two children, Max and Sadie.

Filmography

Film

Television

Video games

Web

See also
 Aqua Teen Hunger Force

References

External links
 
 Interview with Dave Willis on public radio program The Sound of Young America
 
 The Swimcast – interview with Dave Willis, 2008-12-12
 The Swimcast – interview with Dave Willis, 2011-5-12

1970 births
Living people
20th-century American male actors
21st-century American male actors
American male video game actors
American male voice actors
People from Wichita Falls, Texas
Wake Forest University alumni
American male web series actors
Television producers from Texas
American television directors
American television writers
American male screenwriters
American male television writers
Screenwriters from Texas
Showrunners